Sherwell may refer to:

 Percy Sherwell (1880–1948), cricketer
 Russell Sherwell (born 1960), water polo player
 Thomas Sherwell, executed in 1578 in Lima along with John Oxenham

See also
Shirwell, a village, civil parish and former manor in the local government district of North Devon, in the county of Devon, England.